Rich Hulkow is an American former high school and college football coach.

Head coaching record

College

References

External links
 Hulkow named Head Coach at Olivet college in 2009
 Hulkow retires from coaching in 2011

Year of birth missing (living people)
Living people
Olivet Comets football coaches
High school football coaches in Michigan
Eastern Michigan University alumni
Michigan State University alumni
People from Attleboro, Massachusetts